Odivere is a village in Mustvee Parish, Jõgeva County in eastern Estonia. , the population of the village was 72.

References 

Villages in Jõgeva County